Extrusion is a manufacturing process used to make pipes, hoses, drinking straws, curtain tracks, rods, and fibre. The granules melt into a liquid which is forced through a die, forming a long 'tube like' shape. The shape of the die determines the shape of the tube. The extrusion is then cooled and forms a solid shape. The tube may be printed upon, and cut at equal intervals. The pieces may be rolled for storage or packed together.
Shapes that can result from extrusion include T-sections, U-sections, square sections, I-sections, L-sections and circular sections.

One of the most famous products of extrusion moulding is the optical fiber cable.

Extrusion is similar to injection moulding except that a long continuous shape is produced.

See also 
COMPRESSION

References

External links 
http://www.technologystudent.com/equip1/plasextru1.htm

Molding processes